Onur Kumbaracıbaşı (1939 – 15 February 2022) was a Turkish civil servant and politician who served as a government minister.

Biography
Onur Kumbaracıbaşı was born to İbrahim and wife Mualla in Ankara, Turkey, in 1939. He studied in the Faculty of Political Sciences of University of Vienna. After obtaining his PhD degree in the same faculty, he returned to Turkey and served in the State Planning Organization. Then, he was appointed the Dean of Ankara Academy of Economic and Commercial Studies.

He joined the  Social Democratic Populist Party. On 29 November 1987, he was elected into the 18th Parliament of Turkey as a deputy of Kocaeli Province. In the next term, he was elected a deputy from Hatay Province, and he participated in two coalition governments; the 49th and the 50th government of Turkey between  21 November 1991 and 27 July 1994 serving as the Minister of Public Works and Settlement. After his political party merged into the Republican People's Party, he also served as the  Minister of State in the 50th government between 27 March 1995 and 5 October 1995. 

Kumbaracıbaşı died from COVID-19 in Ankara on 15 February 2022, at the age of 83. Two days later, he was buried in Cebeci Asri Cemetery in Ankara.

References

1939 births
2022 deaths
20th-century Turkish politicians
Deaths from the COVID-19 pandemic in Turkey
Politicians from Ankara
University of Vienna alumni
Turkish civil servants
Social Democratic People's Party (Turkey) politicians
Republican People's Party (Turkey) politicians
Deputies of Kocaeli
Deputies of Hatay
Ministers of Public Works of Turkey
Ministers of State of Turkey
Burials at Cebeci Asri Cemetery